The Democratic and Liberal Youth is the youth wing of the Democratic Party of Luxembourg.

It is a member of European Liberal Youth, the youth wing of the European Liberal Democrat and Reform Party.

Democratic Party (Luxembourg)
Youth wings of liberal parties
Youth wings of political parties in Luxembourg